John Sudholz (born 1 May 1946) is a former Australian rules footballer who played with South Melbourne in the VFL. 

Sudholz was a strongly built full-forward from the Victorian town of Rupanyup and made his debut for South Melbourne in 1966. He topped the club's goal kicking for four successive seasons from 1967 to 1970. His best season tally was 60 goals in 1970 in what was a good year for forwards with three of them kicking over 100, Hudson, McKenna and Jesaulenko.

References
Holmesby, Russell and Main, Jim (2007). The Encyclopedia of AFL Footballers. 7th ed. Melbourne: Bas Publishing.

External links

1946 births
Australian rules footballers from Victoria (Australia)
Sydney Swans players
Rupanyup Football Club players
Living people